"Unnamed World" is a CD single by Japanese singer and voice actress Aya Hirano. It was released on April 23, 2008 and was produced by Lantis. The song "Unnamed World" is the ending theme song for the anime Nijū Mensō no Musume.

Track listing
 "Unnamed World"
 Vocals: Aya Hirano
 Composer: Katsuhiko Kurosu
 Arranger: nishi-ken
 "Maybe I Can't Good-bye"
 "Unnamed World" (off vocal)
 "Maybe I Can't Good-bye" (off vocal)

References

2008 singles
Aya Hirano songs
Lantis (company) singles
2008 songs